The 1994 Youngstown State Penguins football team was an American football team represented Youngstown State University in the 1994 NCAA Division I-AA football season. In their ninth season under head coach Jim Tressel, the team compiled a 14–0–1 record and defeated Boise State in the 1994 NCAA Division I-AA Football Championship Game. 

After playing  to a tie in the opening game, the team won 14 consecutive games, the longest winning streak in school history. It was Youngstown State's third national championship in four years.

Tailback Shawn Patton received the team's most valuable player award, and wide receiver Trent Boykin was named the team's outstanding offensive player. The team's statistical leaders included Shawn Patton with 1,626 rushing yards and quarterback Mark Brungard with 2,453 passing yards and 21 passing touchdowns.

Schedule

References

Youngstown State
Youngstown State Penguins football seasons
NCAA Division I Football Champions
Youngstown State Penguins football